Isla del Trocadero (tr. "trader's island") is an island in the Bay of Cádiz, in Andalusia, Spain.

Situation
The island has an area of 5.25 km² and lies in the southern part of the Bay of Cádiz, southwest of Puerto Real village.

The north of the island is crossed by Spanish national highway N443, which goes from Puerto Real to Cádiz. The industrial area Polígono El Trocadero and the ramp in the national highway named El Trocadero refer to the direct proximity of the island.

Protected area
The Isla del Trocadero belongs to large protected area and a natural park (Parque Natural de la Bahía de Cádiz), with an extension of 100 km2. The area is an important wetland biotope and landing zone for migratory birds.

Access to the island
The island can be accessed by the ports of Puerto Real and Matagorda. It is particularly interesting for bird watching.

History
The island has been an important commercial traffic point for a long time, hence its name  It was also used to repair ships. The San Luis Fort, in the Southern tip of the island, was used as part of the defences of the Bay of Cádiz.

The fort, currently in ruins, was captured by French troops  during the Battle of Trocadero, on August 31, 1823. This lends name to the Trocadéro area in the 16th arrondissement of Paris, which featured the Palais du Trocadéro in the 19th century, and in celebration of which the London Trocadero was named a few years later.

Trocadero
Geography of the Province of Cádiz
Protected areas of Andalusia
Landforms of Andalusia